A list of films produced by the Bollywood film industry based in Mumbai in 1922:

1922 in Indian cinema
The first Levy of Entertainment Tax was introduced in Bengal in 1922, followed by its introduction in Bombay in 1923.
Fatma Begum, who got her early training acting in plays, started working in films in 1922. Mother to actresses Zubeida, Sultana and Shehzadi, Fatma went on to become the first woman producer and director when she formed her own production company Fatma Films in 1926.
Dhirendranath Ganguly, who had initially set up Indo-British Film Studio with Nitish Lahiri in 1918, returned to Hyderabad and started the Lotus Film Company there in 1922 up to 1924. He produced six films in 1922, including Bimata (Stepmother), and acted in Sadhu Aur Shaitan.
Manilal Joshi started his career as a director with his debut film Veer Abhimanyu. The film was produced by Ardeshir Irani and Bhogilal K. M. Dave who had started their banner, Star Film Company Ltd. in 1922.

Films
Andhare Alo (The Influence Of Love) a Bengali silent film, was directed by Sisir Bhaduri and Naresh Mitra. It was a debut production from Taj Mahal Films, Calcutta. The story was based on a love triangle written by Saratchandra Chatterjee. It's melodramatic content was appreciated by the critics. The film was claimed to be a "huge hit" at the box-office.
Lady Teacher was a social comedy directed by Dhirendranath Ganguly, and is cited as one of the successes of 1922.
Pati Bhakti also called Human Emotions was directed by J. J. Madan for his banner Madan Theatres Ltd. The film was based on a play by Harikrishna Jauhar. The Madras censors "demanded" the removal of an "obscene dance" scene. It made actress Patience Cooper, who starred in the film, "one of the biggest star of that time". The film also featured some of the earliest kissing scenes.
Sukanya Savitri directed by Kanjibhai Rathod for Kohinoor Film Company, starred Miss Moti, Sakina and Jamna. The story was by Mohanlal Dave. The film remains the only surviving work by Kohinoor and Rathod.
Veer Abhimanyu by director Manilal Joshi, also called Virat Swaroop, was a "big-budget mythological" and a first for producers Ardeshir Irani and Bhogilal Dave. It was also a debut for actress Sultana who played the role of Uttara, with Vakil playing Abhimanyu.

A-C

D-M

P-R

S-Z

References

External links
Bollywood films of 1922 at IMDb

1922
Bollywood
Films, Bollywood